Karniewek  is a village in the administrative district of Gmina Pokrzywnica, within Pułtusk County, Masovian Voivodeship, in east-central Poland.

The village has a population of 150.

References

Karniewek